Aviation Mall is a major regional shopping mall in Glens Falls North, New York. It serves the extreme northern portion of the Capital District (Albany Metropolitan Area) as well as the Glens Falls/Lake George area. It is owned and managed by The Pyramid Companies. The mall is anchored by the traditional chains JCPenney, Dick's Sporting Goods, Ollie's Bargain Outlet, Target, Regal Cinemas, and Planet Fitness. This mall currently features a number of prominent specialty stores which are Bath and Body Works, Famous Footwear, Maurices, and Peter Harris.

History
Aviation Mall opened in 1975 with JCPenney and Denby's (a regional chain) as anchors. The mall was relatively small when it first opened, but was later expanded with Sears and then Caldor. In 1994, JCPenney built a new store next to its old store, with mall management reconstructing the former space to feature more small store space. TJ Maxx was added the same year replacing space previously occupied by Magrams. In 1998, Caldor shuttered and was converted to The Bon-Ton. Target built on in 2004, and Dick's Sporting Goods moved into remaining space of the original JCPenney in 2005.

In 2017, Regal Cinemas opened after expanding from seven screens to nine and was upgraded to feature new flooring and wall coverings along with reclining seats.
 
The later 2010's saw multiple traditional chain anchors update their brick-and-mortar fleets after being disrupted by digital retailers in recent years.

On January 31, 2018, it was announced that regional division The Bon-Ton would shutter as part of bankruptcy. On March 4, 2019, it was announced its space will become Ollie's Bargain Outlet which was set to open August 28, 2019.

On August 22, 2018, it was announced that Sears would shutter as part of an ongoing plan to phase out of brick-and-mortar. Potential replacement tenants have been rumored in discussion since 2019.

References

External links
Official Site
Aviation Mall on Deadmalls.com

The Pyramid Companies
Shopping malls in New York (state)
Queensbury, New York
Shopping malls established in 1975
1975 establishments in New York (state)